Magda von Dolcke (28 February 1838 in Åbenrå, Denmark – 1926) was a Danish stage actress and the director of a travelling theatre company, active in Sweden. She is known for her relationship with King Oscar II of Sweden.

She debuted in Denmark under the name Rosalinde Thomsen. In 1860, she had a well known relationship with Bjørnstjerne Bjørnson. In 1873–1874, she was a guest actor at the Royal Dramatic Theatre in Stockholm. At this point, she had a relationship with the king, during which the queen, Sofia of Nassau, left for Germany, officially for her health. After 1874, she was active at Mindre teatern and from 1876 at Djurgårdsteatern and Folkteatern. August Strindberg admired her natural way of acting while Fritz von Dardel called her a beautiful but talentless adventurer who was given a place at the royal theatre because of her affair with the monarch. From 1874, she toured the country with her own theatre company, where among others Albert Ranft had his debut. She retired from the stage after her marriage to a factory owner Bosse in Copenhagen.

References

External links

1838 births
Mistresses of Swedish royalty
1926 deaths
19th-century Danish actresses
Danish stage actresses
Danish theatre directors
People from Aabenraa Municipality
19th-century theatre managers
19th-century Danish businesswomen